X: The Godless Void and Other Stories is the tenth studio album by Austin, Texas alternative rock outfit ...And You Will Know Us by the Trail of Dead, released January 17, 2020 on Dine Alone Records.

Background
Recording for the album started in 2018, after Conrad Keely returned to the US after five years in Cambodia, and took place at four different studios. Two studios based in Austin (Charles Godfrey's own Scary American and The Mosaic Sound Collective) and two studios in Nashville (The Library Studios and The Henhouse Studio) were used for recording. The album was announced on November 14, 2019, along with the track list, the release date, an accompanying tour, and the first single "Don't Look Down." It was widely noted that this would be their tenth studio album released in the year of the band's 25th Anniversary. X: The Godless Void and Other Stories also marks a return to the band's original personnel with Jason Reece and Conrad Keely acting as the only official members of the group, with all other recording musicians present only as supporting members.

Critical reception

Reviews for X: The Godless Void and Other Stories were largely positive upon release, with a Metacritic average of 80/100, indicating generally favorable reviews.

Track listing

Personnel
...And You Will Know Us by the Trail of Dead
 Jason Reece – songwriter, performer
 Conrad Keely – producer, recording, writer, performer, artwork, design

Additional musicians
 Aaron Blount – guitar
 Will Courtney – backing vocals (track 10)
 Autry Fulbright II – bass guitar
 Jamie Miller – drums, percussion (tracks 1, 2, 4, 8 and 12)
 Krystal Morris – vocal percussion (sampling) (track 1)
 Cully Symington – drums (tracks 1, 2, 3 and 5)

Production
 Charles Godfrey – producer, recording
 Rich Mendez – pre-production assistant
 Peter Van 't Riet – mastering

Charts

See also
List of 2020 albums

References

2020 albums
...And You Will Know Us by the Trail of Dead albums
Dine Alone Records albums